Neonitocris bourgeati is a species of beetle in the family Cerambycidae. It was described by Stephan von Breuning and Pierre Téocchi in 1978.

References

bourgeati
Beetles described in 1978